Joílson may refer to:
Joílson (footballer, born 1976), born Joílson Rodrigues da Silva, Brazilian football midfielder
Joílson (footballer, born 1979), born Joílson Rodrigues Macedo, Brazilian football defender
Joílson (footballer, born 1991), born Joílson de Jesus Cardoso, Brazilian football defender
Joílson Júnior (born 1998), Brazilian Greco-Roman wrestler
Joilson Santana (born 1964), Brazilian boxer